Thomas Martinetz (born 2 January 1962 in Nettesheim) is a German physicist and neuro-informatician.

Life 
Thomas Martinetz studied mathematics and physics at the Technical University of Munich, where he earned his doctorate in theoretical biophysics under Klaus Schulten in 1992 after several years as a guest at the University of Illinois at Urbana-Champaign. After working in the central research and development department of Siemens AG, in 1996 he moved to a professorship at the Institute for Neuroinformatics of the Ruhr University Bochum and took over the management of the Center for Neuroinformatics GmbH.  In 1999 he accepted a call to the University of Lübeck as director of the Institute for Neuro- and Bioinformatics. From 2006 to 2008 he was Vice-Rector of the University of Lübeck, and from 2008 to 2011 Vice-President for Research and Technology Transfer. Since 2013 he is chairman of the Senate of the University of Lübeck.

His major contribution in the field of neuroinformatics is the so-called Neural gas, a variant of self-organizing maps.

He is co-founder of the software companies Consideo, the Pattern Recognition Company and gestigon.

Awards 
The Center for Neuroinformatics GmbH, whose management he took over in 1996, was awarded in the same year with the Innovation Award of the German economy.  awarded him as a "courageous entrepreneur", and in 2011 he received the transfer award of the Innovation Foundation Schleswig-Holstein.

Publications

References

1962 births
20th-century German physicists
University of Illinois Urbana-Champaign faculty
Living people
21st-century German physicists